The 1919 Washington football team was an American football team that represented the University of Washington during the 1919 college football season.  In its second, non-consecutive season under coach Claude J. Hunt, the team compiled a 5–1 record, was co-champion of the Pacific Coast Conference, and outscored its opponents by a combined total of 202 to 31.  Ervin Dailey was the team captain.

The university's "Sun Dodgers" nickname was suggested in November 1919, but not officially adopted by the students until January 28, 1920.

Schedule

References

Washington
Pac-12 Conference football champion seasons
Washington Huskies football seasons
Washington football